David Miquel Mendes da Silva Gonçalves (born 4 August 1982) is a Dutch former professional footballer. During his career, he played for Red Bull Salzburg, AZ, Sparta Rotterdam, Ajax, Panathinaikos and NAC Breda. He was a versatile player who could play all over midfield and in defence, and was known for his dribbling technique as well as his tackling.

Club career
Born in Rotterdam, Mendes da Silva started his career at hometown club Sparta Rotterdam, graduating through their youth system, signing a professional contract in 1999 and departing in 2004; he spent some time on loan at Ajax in 2003 without making any official appearances. The next stop in his career was NAC Breda, where he made 56 appearances, scoring five goals, across two seasons.

In 2006, he was signed by AZ Alkmaar on a five-year deal. He was a regular at AZ for four seasons which included a Dutch title triumph in 2008–09, making 119 appearances and scoring 11 goals in all competitions.

In 2010 he transferred for an undisclosed fee to Red Bull Salzburg, whose coach Huub Stevens had identified Mendes da Silva as a major transfer target; he signed a three-year contract with the Austrian side. He had previously worked with Stevens' assistant Ton Lokhoff during his spell at NAC Breda.

On 20 October 2009, Mendes da Silva scored a 93rd-minute equaliser against Arsenal in the UEFA Champions League to give his team somewhat of a historic result. He stayed with Red Bull until February 2013.

On 4 July 2013, Mendes da Silva signed for Greek club Panathinaikos, managed by former Roda JC and Ajax triker Giannis Anastasiou, on a three-year deal for an undisclosed fee. With his new team he won the Greek Cup in the 2013–14 season against PAOK with a 4–1 scoreline, and after finishing first in the Super League playoffs Panathinaikos played in the third and playoff rounds of the UEFA Champions League, where they were defeated and dropped into the group stage of the 2014–15 UEFA Europa League.

International career
He having played for the Dutch U-20s team at the 2001 FIFA World Youth Championship (losing to Egypt in the quarter-finals), Mendes da Silva made his full international debut for the Netherlands on 7 February 2007. In total he earned seven caps, with his last appearance for the Oranje in 2009, coming on in the 84th minute of a 0–0 draw with Australia.

Honours

Club
AZ
 Eredivisie: 2008–09
 Johan Cruijff Schaal: 2009

Red Bull Salzburg
 Tipp 3 Bundesliga: 2011–12
 ÖFB-Cup: 2011–12

Panathinaikos
 Greek Cup: 2014

References

External links
 

1982 births
Living people
Association football midfielders
Dutch footballers
Netherlands youth international footballers
Netherlands international footballers
Dutch expatriate footballers
Sparta Rotterdam players
NAC Breda players
AFC Ajax players
AZ Alkmaar players
FC Red Bull Salzburg players
Panathinaikos F.C. players
Footballers from Rotterdam
Dutch sportspeople of Cape Verdean descent
Eredivisie players
Eerste Divisie players
Austrian Football Bundesliga players
Super League Greece players
Expatriate footballers in Austria
Expatriate footballers in Greece
Dutch expatriate sportspeople in Austria
Panathinaikos F.C. non-playing staff